Joke Kos (born 16 February 1956) is a Dutch gymnast. She competed in six events at the 1976 Summer Olympics.

References

External links
 

1956 births
Living people
Dutch female artistic gymnasts
Olympic gymnasts of the Netherlands
Gymnasts at the 1976 Summer Olympics
People from Heemskerk
Sportspeople from North Holland